Doxa Megalopolis F.C. is a Greek football club, based in Megalopolis, Arcadia.

Honors

Domestic Titles and honors
 Greek Football Amateur Cup: 1
 2006–07
 Arcadia FCA  Champions: 9
 1976–77, 1978–79, 1980–81, 1982–83, 1985–86, 1992–93, 1994–95, 2005–06, 2015–16
 Arcadia FCA  Cup Winners: 8
 1977–78, 1978–79, 1980–81, 1993–94, 1995–96, 2000–01, 2005–06, 2006–07

Gamma Ethniki clubs
Arcadia, Peloponnese
Association football clubs established in 1956
1956 establishments in Greece